Wajdi Kechrida (born 5 November 1995) is a professional footballer who plays as a right-back for Super League Greece club Atromitos. Born in France, he plays for the Tunisia national team.

Club career
Kechrida made his professional debut for Étoile Sportive du Sahel in a 3–0 Tunisian Ligue Professionnelle 1 win over ES Zarzis on 10 September 2016.

On 31 July 2021 he was purchased by U.S. Salernitana 1919, strongly desired by Salernitana's manager Angelo Mariano Fabiani. He made his first appearance in the Coppa Italia match against Reggina, won 2-0 by Salernitana, and his debut in Serie A in the first day of the season against Bologna.

On 29 August 2022, Kechrida signed a two-year contract with Atromitos in Greece.

International career
Kechrida made his debut for the Tunisia in a 2019 Africa Cup of Nations qualification 4–0 win over Eswatini on 22 March 2019.

Career statistics

International

References

External links
 

1995 births
Living people
Footballers from Nice
Tunisian footballers
Association football midfielders
Tunisia international footballers
Tunisia under-23 international footballers
French footballers
French expatriate sportspeople in Italy
French expatriate sportspeople in Greece
French sportspeople of Tunisian descent
2019 Africa Cup of Nations players
Tunisian Ligue Professionnelle 1 players
Serie A players
Super League Greece players
Étoile Sportive du Sahel players
U.S. Salernitana 1919 players
Atromitos F.C. players
Tunisian expatriate footballers
Tunisian expatriate sportspeople in Italy
Expatriate footballers in Italy
Tunisian expatriate sportspeople in Greece
Expatriate footballers in Greece
2022 FIFA World Cup players